Timeline of motor and engine technology
 (c. 30–70 AD) – Hero of Alexandria describes the first documented steam-powered device, the aeolipile.
 13th century – Chinese chronicles wrote about a solid-rocket motor used in warfare.
 1698 – Thomas Savery builds a steam-powered water pump for pumping water out of mines.
 1712 – Thomas Newcomen builds a piston-and-cylinder steam-powered water pump for pumping water out of mines.
 1769 – James Watt patents his first improved steam engine.

19th Century
 1806 – François Isaac de Rivaz invented a hydrogen powered engine, the first successful internal combustion engine.
 1807 – Nicéphore Niépce and his brother Claude build a fluid piston internal combustion engine, the Pyréolophore and use it to power a boat up the river Saône.
 1816 – Robert Stirling invented his hot air Stirling engine, and what we now call a "regenerator".
 1821 – Michael Faraday builds an electricity-powered motor.
 1824 – Nicolas Léonard Sadi Carnot first publishes that the efficiency of a heat engine depends on the temperature difference between an engine and its environment.
 1837 – First American patent for an electric motor.
 1850 – The first explicit statement of the first and second law of thermodynamics, given by Rudolf Clausius.
 1860 - Lenoir 2 cycle engine 
 1872 - Brayton Engine 
 1877 – Nicolaus Otto patents a four-stroke internal combustion engine.
 1882 – James Atkinson invents the Atkinson cycle engine, now common in some hybrid vehicles.
 1885 – Gottlieb Daimler patents the first supercharger.
 1886 – Hot bulb engine was established by Herbert Akroyd Stuart,  Gottlieb Daimler invents the Petrol engine.
 1888 – An AC induction motor is featured in a paper published by Galileo Ferraris and is patented in the U.S. by Nikola Tesla.
 1892 – Rudolf Diesel patents the Diesel engine.
 1899 – Ferdinand Porsche creates the Lohner–Porsche, the first hybrid vehicle.

20th Century

 1903 – The Exploration of Cosmic Space by Means of Reaction Devices was published by Konstantin Tsiolkovsky
 1905 – Alfred Büchi patents the turbocharger.
 1913 – René Lorin invents the ramjet.
 1915 – Leonard Dyer invents a six-stroke engine, now known as the Crower six-stroke engine named after his reinventor Bruce Crower.
 1926 - Robert H. Goddard  launched the first liquid-fueled rocket.
 1929 – Felix Wankel patents the Wankel rotary engine.
 Late 1930s – Hans von Ohain and Frank Whittle separately build pioneering gas turbine engines intended for aircraft propulsion, leading to the pioneering turbojet powered flights in 1939 Germany and 1941 England.
 1939 – The BMW company's BMW 801 aviation radial engine pioneers the use of an early form of an engine control unit, the Kommandogerät.
 1940s – Ralph Miller patents his Miller cycle engine.
 1954 – Felix Wankel creates the first working Wankel engine.
 1957 – Rambler Rebel announced Electrojector electronic fuel injection option, however no production models were offered with the option.
 1964 – Ion engine invented.
 1966 – RD-0410  nuclear thermal rocket engine was ground-tested.
 1960s – alternators replace generators on automobile engines.
 1970s – electronically controlled ignition appears in automobile engines.
 1975 – Catalytic converters are first widely introduced on production automobiles in the US to comply with tightening EPA regulations on auto exhaust.
 1980s – electronically controlled ignition improved to reduce pollution.
 1980s – electronic fuel injection appears on gasoline automobile engines.
 1990s – Hybrid vehicles that run on an internal combustion engine (ICE) and an electric motor charged by regenerative braking.

See also
 Timeline of heat engine technology for a view of the human understanding of the interchangeability of work and heat.

References

Motor